The 2016 European Women's Handball Championship was held in Sweden from 4 to 18 December 2016. It was the second time that Sweden hosts the tournament, after it also hosted the 2006 European Women's Handball Championship.

Sweden was awarded the championship on the EHF Congress in Monaco on 23 June 2012.

Norway won their seventh title after a 30–29 victory over the Netherlands. France captured the bronze medal, after a 25–22 victory over Denmark.

Venues

Qualification

Qualified teams

Note: Bold indicates champion for that year. Italic indicates host for that year.

Draw
The draw was held on 10 June 2016 at 13:00 local time at the Lisebergshallen in Gothenburg, Sweden.

Squads

Referees
14 referee pairs were selected on 17 June 2016, of which 12 will be refereeing the tournament. Of these, 7 pairs are women and 5 are men.

Preliminary round
The schedule was announced on 16 June 2016.

All times are local (UTC+1).

Group A

Group B

Group C

Group D

Main round
Points obtained against qualified teams from the same group were carried over.

Group I

Group II

Knockout stage

Bracket

Semifinals

Fifth place game

Third place game

Final

Final ranking and statistics

All Star Team
The All Star Team and awards were announced on 18 December 2016.

Top goalscorers

Top goalkeepers

References

External links
Official website

 
2016
2016 in Swedish women's sport
2016 in women's handball
International handball competitions hosted by Sweden
Women's handball in Sweden
December 2016 sports events in Europe
2010s in Stockholm
International sports competitions in Stockholm
International sports competitions in Gothenburg
Sports competitions in Helsingborg
International sports competitions in Malmö
Sports competitions in Kristianstad
2010s in Gothenburg
2010s in Malmö